(born 17 December 1953), also known as Ikue Ile, is a drummer, electronic musician, composer, and graphic designer. Mori was awarded a "Genius grant" from the MacArthur Foundation in 2022.

Biography
Ikue Mori was born and raised in Japan. She says she had little interest in music before hearing punk rock. In 1977, she went to New York City, initially for a visit, but she became involved in the music scene, and has remained in New York since.

Her first musical experience was as the drummer for seminal no wave band DNA, which also featured East Village musician Arto Lindsay. Though she had little prior musical experience (and had never played drums), Mori quickly developed a distinctive style: One critic describes her as "a tight, tireless master of shifting asymmetrical rhythm", while Lester Bangs wrote that she "cuts Sunny Murray in my book" His comment is no small praise, as Murray is widely considered a major free jazz drummer.

After DNA disbanded, Mori became active in the New York experimental music scene. She abandoned her drum set, and began playing drum machines, which she sometimes modified to play various samples. According to Mori, she was trying to make the drum machines "sound broken." Critic Adam Strohm writes that she "founded a new world for the instrument, taking it far beyond backing rhythms and robotic fills." In recent years she has used a laptop as her primary instrument, but is still sometimes credited with "electronic percussion".

In 1995, she began collaborating with Japanese bass guitarist Kato Hideki (from Ground Zero), and together with experimental guitarist Fred Frith (from Henry Cow), they formed Death Ambient. The trio released three albums, Death Ambient (1995), Synaesthesia (1999) and Drunken Forest (2007).

Beyond her solo recordings, she has recorded or performed with Dave Douglas, Butch Morris, Kim Gordon, Thurston Moore, and many others, including as Hemophiliac, a trio with John Zorn and singer Mike Patton, as well as being a member of Zorn's Electric Masada. With Zeena Parkins, she records and tours as duo project Phantom Orchard.  She often records on Tzadik, as well as designing the covers for many of their albums.

Mori has drawn inspiration from visual arts. Her 2000 release, One Hundred Aspects of the Moon was inspired by famed Japanese artist Yoshitoshi. Her 2005 recording, Myrninerest, is inspired by outsider artist Madge Gill.

Mori received a 2005-2006 Foundation for Contemporary Arts Grants to Artists Award.

In 2022 Mori received the MacArthur Fellowship award ("Genius Grant").

Discography

 Painted Desert (with Robert Quine and Marc Ribot; 1995)
 Hex Kitchen (1995)
 Garden (1996)
 David Watson / Jim Denley / Rik Rue / Amanda Stewart / Ikue Mori - Bit-Part Actor (Braille Records, 1996)
 B/Side (1998)
 One Hundred Aspects of the Moon (2000)
 Labyrinth (2001)
 Phantom Orchard (2004)
 Myrninerest (2005)
 Bhima Swarga (2007)
 Class Insecta (2009)
 Near Nadir (with Mark Nauseef, Evan Parker and Bill Laswell; 2011)
 The Nows (Paul Lytton/Nate Wooley + Ikue Mori/Ken Vandermark; Clean Feed, 2012)
 Highsmith (with Craig Taborn; Tzadik, 2017)
   Sand Storm   (with Kaze) (Atypeek Diffusion / Circum-Disc, 2021)
With Lotte Anker & Sylvie Courvoisier
Alien Huddle (Intakt, 2008)
With Mephista (Mori, Sylvie Courvoisier and Susie Ibarra)
Black Narcissus (Tzadik, 2002)
Entomological Reflections (Tzadik, 2004)
With Cyro Baptista
Infinito (Tzadik, 2009)
With Dave Douglas
Freak In (RCA, 2003)
With Erik Friedlander
Claws and Wings (Skipstone, 2013)
With Fred Frith and Ensemble Modern
Traffic Continues (Winter & Winter, 2000)
  Later...   (Les Disques VICTO, 2000)
  A Mountain Doesn't Know It's Tall   (Intakt Records, 2015)
With Maybe Monday
Unsquare (Intakt, 2008)
With Rova::Orchestrova
Electric Ascension (Atavistic, 2005)
With Kim Gordon and DJ Olive
SYR5: ミュージカル パースペクティブ (Sonic Youth Recordings, 2000)
With George Spanos
Dreams Beyond  (Evolver Records, 2014)
With John Zorn
Locus Solus (Rift, 1983)
The Bribe (Tzadik, 1986 [1998])
Godard/Spillane  (Tzadik, 1987 [1999])
Filmworks III: 1990–1995 (Toy's Factory, 1995)
Filmworks VI: 1996 (Tzadik, 1996)
Cobra: John Zorn's Game Pieces Volume 2  (Tzadik, 2002)
Hemophiliac (Tzadik, 2002) with Hemophiliac
Voices in the Wilderness (Tzadik, 2003)
The Unknown Masada (Tzadik, 2003)
50th Birthday Celebration Volume 4 (Tzadik, 2004) with Electric Masada
50th Birthday Celebration Volume 6 (Tzadik, 2004) with Hemophiliac
Mysterium (Tzadik, 2005)
Electric Masada: At the Mountains of Madness (Tzadik, 2005) with Electric Masada
Filmworks XVI: Workingman's Death (Tzadik, 2005)
Six Litanies for Heliogabalus (Tzadik, 2007)
Femina (Tzadik, 2009)
Interzone (Tzadik, 2010)
Rimbaud (Tzadik, 2012)
In Lambeth (Tzadik, 2013) with the Gnostic Trio
On Leaves of Grass (Tzadik, 2014) with the Nova Quartet
With Medicine SingersMedicine Singers(Joyful Noise Recordings)''

References

External links

IkueMori.com (official site)
Ikue Mori (myspace)
Discography of Ikue Mori
Ikue Mori, Interviewed by Theresa Stern, November 1997
Phantom Orchard
Discography by Patrice Roussel 

1953 births
Living people
Musicians from Tokyo
Tzadik Records artists
American women drummers
American women composers
American jazz composers
American rock drummers
American women jazz musicians
Japanese expatriates in the United States
Japanese experimental musicians
Japanese rock drummers
No wave musicians
Japanese women in electronic music
American women in electronic music
20th-century American drummers
20th-century American women musicians
Intakt Records artists
21st-century American women